Uwe Schuenemann (born 8 August 1964) is a German politician (Christian Democratic Union of Germany) and former interior minister of the German state of the federation Lower Saxony. In the course of his office, he is known for relatively hard-line stances.

Biography 

Schünemann attended Gymnasium an der Wilhelmstraße (later Campe-Gymnasium) in Holzminden, where he acquired his Abitur in 1984. After that he completed his training as an industrial clerk, before doing his basic military service in 1987/1988.

Preceding his election to the Landtag in 1994, he was employed as industrial clerk at Haarmann & Reimer GmbH (today Symrise) in Holzminden.

For several years he played Basketball at MTV Altendorf, reaching Bezirksoberliga of Lower Saxony. Schünemann is member of the Schützenverein Sportschützenclub v.1955 e.V. Holzminden.

Political career 

In 1979, Schünemann joined Junge Union. In 1984 he also joined CDU and was elected to the Holzminden city council the same year. From 1990 through 1999 he chaired the Holzminden (town) CDU, since 1997 he is also the leader of the Holzminden (district) CDU. Starting 1996 through 1999 he was mayor of Holzminden, after that deputy mayor. Since 1996 he is member of Holzminden district council.

He is member of the Landtag of Lower Saxony in its 13th and 14th legislature (since June 1994). Starting March 2000 until March 2003 he was Chief Whip of CDU's Landtag faction.

Between 4 March 2003 and January 2013 he was Minister of the Interior and Sports of Lower Saxony and member of Bundesrat. In 2009 Schünemann initiated the initiative White IT against child pornography in the internet.

References

External links 
 Wikimedia Commons' resources about Uwe Schünemann
 Uwe Schünemann's official web site (German)

1964 births
Living people
Christian Democratic Union of Germany politicians
Members of the Landtag of Lower Saxony
People from Holzminden (district)
Ministers of the Lower Saxony State Government